Yana Ivanovna Tyshchenko (born 1 August 2000) is a Russian track cyclist.

She won a medal at the 2021 UCI Track Cycling World Championships.

References

External links

2000 births
Living people
Russian female cyclists
Russian track cyclists